Euchromia creusa is a moth of the subfamily Arctiinae. The species was first described by Carl Linnaeus in his 1758 10th edition of Systema Naturae. It is found in Australia (northern Queensland), Ceram, Key Island, New Guinea, the New Hebrides, the Solomon Islands, the Pelew Islands, Fiji and Vanuatu.

The wingspan is about 50 mm. Adults are wasp mimics. They have black wings, with transparent spots and a blue comma-shaped mark near the centre of the forewing. The hindwings are about half the span of the forewings. There are transverse black and red bands on the body.

References

Moths described in 1758
Taxa named by Carl Linnaeus
Euchromiina